Line 2 of the Shijiazhuang Metro is a rapid transit line in Shijiazhuang. It was opened on 26 August 2020.

Opening timeline

Stations

References

02
Railway lines opened in 2020